Les Mesnuls is a commune in the Yvelines department in the Île-de-France region in north-central France.

History
The place was called Ménil until the 13th century, before becoming Les Mesnils, then Les Mesnuls. The name derives from Latin mansionile, meaning a small mansio, or dwelling

Interesting Sights
 Église Saint-Éloi, 15th century.
 The Château des Mesnuls: the first elements (entrance gate, moat) were built during the 16th century, and the main body dates from 1731. Protected since 1945, it has been classified as monument historique since 1975.
 Chapelle Notre-Dame du Chêne on the road to Montfort-l'Amaury, built around 1825.
 Communal laundry house in rue du Moulin, 19th century.

See also
Communes of the Yvelines department

References

 Monique Bardy. La grande histoire des Yvelines, éditions Édijac, Pontoise 1989, 

Communes of Yvelines